Las Huertas is a town in the Municipality of Alaquines located in Mexico.

Populated places in San Luis Potosí